Chaim Baruch Yehudah Daskal, also known as Reb Chaim of Yerushalayim, (March 28, 1961 – June 21, 2014) was the founder and curator of Shabbos With Chaim in Yerushalayim and the Shabbos Awareness Center. Reb Chaim was known for his boundless love for his fellow Jews, and mostly his inspirational story telling. He was descended from Rav Shraga Shmuel Shmelka of Tchabeh, the Skulener Rebbe and the Nikolsburger Rebbe.

References

1961 births
2014 deaths
20th-century rabbis in Jerusalem
21st-century rabbis in Jerusalem
Descendants of the Baal Shem Tov